Qijia may refer to:

Qijia culture, early Bronze Age culture distributed around western Gansu and eastern Qinghai, China
Qijia, Longhua County, town in Longhua County, Hebei, China
Qijia Township, township in Shangyi County, Hebei, China